Brig Gen Jongile Maso is an artillery general officer in the South African Army who served as Commanding Officer 4 Artillery Regiment during 2014–2016. He previously served as the Commander of the DOD Mobilisation Centre from 2017-2021.

Early life

Maso was born in Queenstown and grew up in Mdantsane, East London where he matriculated. He joined the uMkhonto we Sizwe and was trained in Uganda.

Military career 

He served as Officer Instructor at the School of Artillery from 2001. Observation Post Officer, Battery Reconnaissance Officer, Battery Post Officer and Battery Commander at the 155mm GV-5 Battery (Sierra) from 2002 to 2009 at 4 Artillery Regiment.

2IC Artillery Mobilization Regiment and later regimental commander at the same unit. He completed the Senior Command and Staff Course in 2013. Officer Commanding 4 Artillery Regiment on 1 March 2014 until 31 Dec 2016. He was awarded the crossed-barrels by Brig Gen Khaya Makina in 2017.He is appointed as the General Officer Commanding South African Army Artillery Formation with effect from 1 November 2021.

Honours and awards

Medals

References 

South African military officers
Living people
Year of birth missing (living people)
UMkhonto we Sizwe personnel
South African Army generals
People from Queenstown, South Africa